This is a list of Old Haleians, they being notable former students of Hale School, an Anglican Church school presently located in Wembley Downs, a suburb of Perth, Western Australia.

Royalty
 Sharafuddin Idris Shah – Sultan of Selangor, Malaysia
 Tunku Ismail Idris – Crown Prince of Johor

Vice regal
 Sir Colin Hannah – Governor of Queensland
 Sir Stephen Parker – Lieutenant Governor of Western Australia

Academia and science
Kevin Cullen– doctor, winemaker
George Winterton – Professor of Constitutional Law at the University of Sydney

Arts
Sam Roberts-Smith, operatic baritone

Business
 John Bennison – general manager of Wesfarmers
 Alexander Forrest – landowner and developer, explorer
 Andrew Forrest – Chairman and CEO of Fortescue Metals Group; philanthropist (also attended Christ Church Grammar School)
 Richard Goyder – CEO of Wesfarmers and chairman of Australian Football League
 Lang Hancock – asbestos and iron ore magnate
 E. A. "Peter" Wright – mining magnate
Melvin Poh – media entrepreneur

Law

Chief Justice
 Sir Stephen Parker – Chief Justice of Western Australia

Others – law

 Robert Nicholson – Justice of the Federal Court of Australia and the Supreme Court of Western Australia

Media, entertainment, culture and the arts
 Robert Drewe – author, journalist (winner, Walkley Award)
 Edward Fiennes-Clinton, 18th Earl of Lincoln – author
 Robert Juniper – painter
 Edward Russell – television presenter 
 Meyne Wyatt – actor, Redfern Now
 Basil Zempilas – television presenter (Seven News)

Military

Victoria Cross recipient
 Benjamin Roberts-Smith – recipient of the Victoria Cross for Australia and Medal for Gallantry

Chiefs of services
 Sir Valston Hancock – Chief of the Air Staff, Royal Australian Air Force
 Sir Colin Hannah – Chief of the Air Staff, Royal Australian Air Force

Great Escape survivor
 Paul Royle – pilot

Politics and public service

Premiers
 Richard Court, AC – Premier of Western Australia
 Hendy Cowan – Deputy Premier of Western Australia
 Peter Dowding – Premier of Western Australia (also attended Caulfield Grammar School and The Scots College)
 Sir John Forrest – first Premier of Western Australia
 Sir Walter Hartwell James – Premier of Western Australia
 George Leake – Premier of Western Australia
 Sir Ross McLarty – Premier of Western Australia

Ministers
 Septimus Burt – Attorney-General, Western Australia
 Thomas Davy – Attorney-General, Minister for Education, Western Australia
 Sir Victor Garland – Minister in various portfolios, McMahon Ministry and Second and Third Fraser Ministries, Australia
 Bill Hassell – Minister in various portfolios, Court Ministry, Western Australia
 Christian Porter – Minister in various portfolios, Barnett Ministry, Western Australia

Other members of parliament
 Brian Greig  – Australian Senator for Western Australia, Leader of the Australian Democrats
 Hugh Guthrie – Member of the Western Australian Legislative Assembly and Speaker of the Legislative Assembly
 Edward Bertram Johnston – Member of the Western Australian Legislative Council and Australian Senator for Western Australia
 Anthony Trethowan – Member of the Western Australian Legislative Assembly, clergyman
 Charles Wittenoom – Member of the Western Australian Legislative Council

Others – politics and public service

Diplomatic officers
 Sir Victor Garland – Australian High Commissioner to the United Kingdom
 Bill Hassell – Agent-General for Western Australia, London; Consul-General for Germany, Western Australia
 David Irvine – Australian High Commissioner to Papua New Guinea; Australian Ambassador to China and concurrently Ambassador to Mongolia and North Korea
 Sir Walter Hartwell James – Agent-General for Western Australia, London
 Sir Edward Wittenoom – Consul-General for France, Western Australia

Mayors
Peter Nattrass – Lord Mayor of the City of Perth
Charles Veryard – Lord Mayor of the City of Perth
Charles Wittenoom – Mayor of Albany Municipal Council
Basil Zempilas – Lord Mayor of the City of Perth

Sport

Australian rules football
Old Haleians playing in the Australian Football League include:
 Michael Gardiner – West Coast Eagles, St Kilda Saints, played in AFL Grand Final, 2009
 Kasey Green – West Coast Eagles, North Melbourne Kangaroos
 Brett Jones – West Coast Eagles
 Chad Jones – AFL player (West Coast Eagles, North Melbourne Kangaroos)
 Matthew Leuenberger – Brisbane Lions
 Paul Medhurst – Fremantle Dockers, Collingwood Magpies, Anzac Day Medal winner, 2008
 Cale Morton – Melbourne Demons, West Coast Eagles, Larke Medal winner, 2007
 Jarryd Morton – Hawthorn Hawks
 Mitchell Morton – West Coast Eagles, Richmond Tigers, Sydney Swans
 Jason Norrish – Melbourne Demons, Fremantle Dockers
 Tom Mitchell – Sydney Swans, Hawthorn Hawks, Brownlow Medal winner, 2018
 Nick Kommer – Essendon Bombers
 Michael Clark – Fremantle Dockers, Collingwood Magpies
 Michael Evans – Melbourne Demons
 Tom Barrass – West Coast Eagles
 Michael Aitken – Carlton Blues
 Digby Morrell – North Melbourne Kangaroos, Carlton Blues
 Adam Lange – North Melbourne Kangaroos
 Cameron Venables – Collingwood Magpies
 Clancy Rudeforth – West Coast Eagles
 Tim Gepp – Richmond Tigers, Western Bulldogs
 Mitch Georgiades- Port Adelaide Football Club
 Darcy Cameron- Collingwood Football Club
 Shane McAdam- Adelaide Football Club
 Kyron Hayden- North Melbourne Football Club
 Jy Farrar- Gold Coast Suns

Cricket
 Geoff Marsh – international player (Australia) and coach (Australia, Zimbabwe, Pune Warriors India and Sri Lanka)
 Theo Doropoulos – state player (Western Australia, South Australia)
 Marcus Stoinis – state player (Western Australia)
 Michael Clark – state player (Western Australia)
 David Bandy – state player (Western Australia)
 Arthur Lodge – state player (Western Australia)

Golf
 Curtis Luck – US Amateur Golf Champion 2016

Hockey
 Mark Hickman – international player (Australia), including at the Champions Trophy (1996, 1998, 2000, 2001, 2002, 2003), Commonwealth Games (1998 (gold medallist) and 2002 (gold medallist)) and World Hockey Cup (2002 (silver medallist))

Olympics
 Mark Hickman – hockey (Australian team), Athens 2004 (gold medallist)
 Percy Oliver – swimming (Australian team), Berlin 1936
 Todd Pearson – swimming (Australian team), Sydney 2000 (gold medallist) and Athens 2004 (silver medallist)
 Deane Pieters – swimming (Australian team) Barcelona 1992
 Nick Porzig – rowing (Australian VIII), Sydney 2000 (silver medallist)
 Rolly Tasker – sailing (Australian team), Melbourne 1956 (silver medallist) and Rome/Naples 1960
Sam McEntee – Athletics (Australian team), Rio de Janeiro 2016

Rugby
 Dane Haylett-Petty
 Ross Haylett-Petty
 Luke Burton
 Ryan Hodson
 Justin Turner (rugby union)
 Nick Jooste
 Carlo Tizzano

Sailing
 Rolly Tasker – international sailor; winner A-division, Fastnet race, 1979; line honours and winner IOR division, Parmelia Yacht Race
 John Longley – Project Manager and crewman of Australia II winner of the America's Cup 1983

See also

 List of schools in Western Australia
 List of boarding schools
 Public Schools Association

References

External links
 Hale School website
 Old Haleians' Association website

Lists of people educated in Western Australia by school affiliation